Lucky One(s) or The Lucky One(s) may refer to:

Film
 D' Lucky Ones, a 2006 Philippine film
 The Lucky Ones (film), a 2008 American film
 The Lucky One (film), a 2012 American film

Literature
 The Lucky Ones (book), a 2003 short-story collection by Rachel Cusk
 The Lucky One (novel), a 2008 novel by Nicholas Sparks

Music

Albums 
 Lucky Ones (album), by Pat Green, 2004
 The Lucky Ones (Mudhoney album), 2008
 The Lucky Ones (Pentatonix album), 2021
 The Lucky Ones (Pride Tiger album), 2007
 The Lucky Ones (Willie P. Bennett album), 1985

Songs 
 "Lucky One" (Amy Grant song), 1994
 "Lucky One" (Exo song), 2016
 "The Lucky One" (Alison Krauss song), 2001
 "The Lucky One" (Faith Hill song), 2006
 "The Lucky One" (Laura Branigan song), 1984
 "The Lucky One" (Uku Suviste song), 2021
 "The Lucky Ones" (song), by Kerli, 2012
 "Lucky One", by Goo Goo Dolls from Boxes, 2016
 "The Lucky One", by Blue October from Home, 2016
 "The Lucky One", by Celldweller from Wish Upon a Blackstar: Chapter 03, 2010
 "The Lucky One", by Taylor Swift from Red, 2012 and Red (Taylor's Version), 2021
 "Lucky Ones", by Kevin Drew from Spirit If..., 2007
 "Lucky Ones", by Lana Del Rey from Born to Die, 2012
 "Lucky Ones", by Loverboy from Get Lucky, 1981

Other
 Lucky One Mall, a shopping mall in Karachi, Pakistan, and an associated residential development